Abdollah Masud-e Sofla (also Romanized as ‘Abdollāh Mas‘ūd-e Soflá; also known as Abdollah Mas’ood, ‘Abdollāh Mas‘ūd, and Abdullāh Masūd) is a village in Hesar-e Valiyeasr Rural District, Central District, Avaj County, Qazvin Province, Iran. At the 2006 census, its population was 72, in 15 families.

References 

Populated places in Avaj County